Muntok or, more commonly, Mentok is a town in the Indonesian province of Bangka-Belitung on the island of Sumatra.  The capital of West Bangka Regency (Bangka Barat), it is the site of the biggest tin smelter on the world. Mentok refers to the tip of the island.

History
Mentok was founded at 1732 by Encek Wan Akub as order of Sultan Palembang Darussalam Sri Susuhan Mahmud Badaruddin I, beginning as a small village consisting of 7 wooden houses for the Royal family of Encek Wan Abdul Jabbar, father-in-law of sultan Badaruddin I of Palembang Darussalam who was married his daughter Zamnah for his 2nd wife from Siantan Natuna.

Encek Wan Akub discovered a large amount of[tin ore at Ulim river, south Bangka Island on a voyage of discovery with his secret task force and reported it to sultan Badaruddin I of Palembang Darussalam.

By approval of sultan Badaruddin I of Palembang Darussalam, Encek Wan Akub ordered his nephew Wan Serin to go to seek tin miners in Johor, Siam and Campa and start tin mining on Bangka Island.

From that time Muntok become an exporter of tin ingots and was filled by merchant ships from many countries including the Dutch East India Company.

In 1812 the British East India Company captured Muntok, renamed it Minto (after Lord Minto, then Governor-General of India),  and used it as their headquarters in Fort Nugent of Tandjoeng Kaleang  to attack Palembang Darussalam for monopoly of the tin trade.

After the Anglo-Dutch Treaty of 1814 in 1816 the British left Bangka Island and Mentok to the Dutch.

In 1913 the Dutch Indies Government moved the capital of the Bangka-Belitung Residency from Mentok to  Pangkal Pinang.

Demographics 
The majority of the people in Mentok are  Malay  and Hakka Chinese. The Malay are moslem, the majority of Chinese are Buddhist, Catholic and Protestant, and there is a small population of Arabian moslems.

Economy
Mentok is a tin smelter town and many people work in the smelter.  Other people are government employees, and there are also fishermen, farmers, and tin miners. Mentok is 3 hours from Palembang by ferry through the Port of Tanjung Kalian and 2 hours by paved road from Pangkal Pinang.

References

External links 
  Old town around Black-nest Swiftlet tower
  Historic town in West Bangka

Populated places in the Bangka Belitung Islands
Regency seats of the Bangka Belitung Islands
Districts of the Bangka Belitung Islands